Jons is a commune in the Rhône department in eastern France.

Jons may also refer to:

 Jöns, a Swedish name
 Mattias Jons (born 1982), Swedish hammer thrower
 JONS or Juntas de Ofensiva Nacional-Sindicalista, former Spanish political movement

See also
 
 
 
 Jon (disambiguation)